In sewing and crafts, an embellishment is anything that adds design interest to the piece.

Examples in sewing and craft
 appliqué can be made by sewing machine of decorative techniques and or
 embroidery, done either by machine or by hand
 piping made from either self-fabric, contrast fabric, or a simply a cord.
 trim (sewing)
 lace, either pre-made or home-made
 Fringe (trim)
 beads
 batik

Items that normally serve a function may also be used as embellishment. For example:
 buttons can be placed anywhere on the piece
 zippers can be unzipped and be used as piping, or simply stitched on
 buckles can be placed anywhere on the piece
 grommets can be placed anywhere even when there is no cord is looped through them
 sequins can be placed anywhere

References

Handicrafts
Fashion design
Sewing